SVS Educational Institutions  is an engineering college located in Arasampalayam, Coimbatore, Tamil Nadu, India. The college have been approved by the All India Council for Technical Education, and is affiliated to Anna University, Chennai.

References

External links
 

Engineering colleges in Coimbatore
Colleges affiliated to Anna University
Educational institutions established in 2009
2009 establishments in Tamil Nadu